Plasticat is a 2003 Croatian computer-animated short film by Simon Bogojević-Narath of Kenges Studio. The short blends a post-apocaliptic sci-fi setting with humanist themes. The short won a number of awards at film festivals in Sao Paulo (Anima mundi, 2003), Zagreb (Oktavija, Dani hrvatskog filma, 2003), London (London International Animation Festival, BFI Future Film Festival, 2004) and Brussels (Brussels International Fantastic Film Festival, 2005).

References

External links

Watch Plasticat

2003 short films
2003 films
2000s animated short films
2003 computer-animated films
Croatian animated short films